The Master of Studies or Master in Studies (M.St. or MSt) is a postgraduate degree at the University of Oxford, University of Cambridge, University of St Andrews, the Australian National University, University of Dublin and the University of Newcastle (Australia). Depending on the degree, it is comparable to the Master of Arts, Master of Business Administration, Master of Laws, Master of Philosophy, and Master of Science.

Its creation was necessitated, in part, by the fact that the Master of Arts degree at Oxford, Cambridge, and Dublin is automatically awarded to graduates after a certain period of time. In contrast, the Master of Studies requires completion of classroom study and a thesis.

See also 
 British degree abbreviations
 Master's degree in Europe
 Master of Studies in Law
 Master of Philosophy

References 

Master's degrees